Hatful of Hollow is a compilation album by English rock band the Smiths, released on 12 November 1984 by Rough Trade Records. The album features BBC Radio 1 studio recordings and two contemporary singles with their B-sides. It was eventually released in the United States on 9 November 1993 by Sire Records, who had initially declined to release the album in the US. Sire instead released Louder Than Bombs in the US in 1987—which contains several of the same tracks as Hatful of Hollow—as well as many from the UK compilation The World Won't Listen.

Hatful of Hollow reached No. 7 on the UK Albums Chart, remaining on the chart for 46 weeks. In 2000, Q magazine placed the album at No. 44 on its list of the "100 Greatest British Albums Ever".

Cover
The current sleeve for Hatful of Hollow is the CD issue sleeve, featuring a cropped photograph of the otherwise unknown Fabrice Colette taken by Gilles Decroix. The original sleeve, pictured above, included a tattoo of a Jean Cocteau drawing on Colette's left shoulder, which Colette commissioned in June 1983 because he idolised Cocteau. The photograph is taken from a July 1983 special edition of the French newspaper Libération. Additionally, the old cover had a large sky-blue frame with the legends "The Smiths" and "Hatful of Hollow" above and underneath the picture. Editions after 1987 feature the cropped version with the text superimposed, although the 2011 vinyl re-issue reinstated the original sleeve.

Composition
The album consists mainly of songs recorded over several BBC Radio 1 sessions in 1983. Tracks shown in bold were included on the album.

 For John Peel on 18 May 1983 (broadcast 31 May): "Handsome Devil", "Reel Around the Fountain", "Miserable Lie", "What Difference Does It Make?" (all four songs were later released as the Peel Sessions EP)
 For David Jensen on 26 June 1983 (broadcast 4 July): "These Things Take Time", "You've Got Everything Now", "Wonderful Woman"
 For Jensen on 25 August, 1983 (broadcast 5 September): "Accept Yourself", "I Don't Owe You Anything", "Pretty Girls Make Graves", "Reel Around the Fountain"
 For Peel on 14 September, 1983 (broadcast 21 September): "This Charming Man", "Back to the Old House", "This Night Has Opened My Eyes", "Still Ill"

When first broadcast, these radio sessions mainly featured songs which were otherwise unavailable. All were subsequently re-recorded for singles or for the band's debut album the following year. "This Night Has Opened My Eyes" was recorded in the studio in June 1984, but the only version ever released was the September Peel session.

Hatful of Hollow also features the band's debut single, "Hand in Glove", and their two most recent singles prior to the album's release, "Heaven Knows I'm Miserable Now" and "William, It Was Really Nothing", along with their respective B-sides, "Girl Afraid", "How Soon Is Now?" and "Please Please Please Let Me Get What I Want".

"How Soon Is Now?" would receive a separate single release in 1985 in both the UK and the US. It reached No. 24 in the British charts, but failed to chart in the US. Morrissey and Johnny Marr lamented the lack of chart success of what they considered their strongest song thus far. "How Soon Is Now?" also featured on the soundtrack to the 1986 film Out of Bounds, but wasn't included on the accompanying soundtrack album.

Song differences
The radio session versions of songs are different from other studio recordings. Some of the major differences are:

"What Difference Does It Make?" has heavier and more natural-sounding guitars than the version on The Smiths. It is also in a higher key than the version on The Smiths.
"These Things Take Time" features bass that is more prominent and drums that are less controlled than in the version from the "What Difference Does It Make?" 12" single. Sliding guitar figures accompany the chorus.
"This Charming Man" has softer and more upbeat vocals, guitars and even drums than the version released as a single and on some versions of The Smiths. The bass line is louder and altered slightly. Additionally, there is no solo guitar introduction.
"Still Ill" opens and closes with a harmonica solo, and sounds less hollow and slightly slower than the version on The Smiths.
"You've Got Everything Now" is slower than the version on The Smiths and does not have any keyboard part. The bass line is also altered slightly.
"Back to the Old House" is an acoustic piece with melancholic guitars and vocals, as opposed to the full band version on the "What Differences Does It Make?" single.
"Reel Around the Fountain" has duller-sounding drums and acoustic guitars than the version on The Smiths. The bass is more prominent, but the piano and organ parts are not included. It is also in a higher key than the version on The Smiths.

In addition, the original single version of "Hand in Glove" is included, not the remixed version that appears on The Smiths. It features a fade-intro and fade-out, louder bass, and vocals that sound very distant.

Track listing
All BBC sessions previously unreleased.

Etchings on vinyl

"THE IMPOTENCE OF ERNEST" is etched into the runout groove of side A. As well as being a pun on Oscar Wilde's The Importance of Being Earnest, it is an allusion to the impotence that Ernest Hemingway suffered in his final years. "Ian (EIRE)", etched on side B, refers to Marr's younger brother.

Personnel
 Morrissey – vocals
 Johnny Marr – guitars, harmonica, mandolin, slide guitar on "How Soon Is Now?"
 Andy Rourke – bass guitar
 Mike Joyce – drums, tambourine

Additional musicians

 John Porter – electronic percussion on "How Soon Is Now?"

Production

 John Porter – producer
 The Smiths – producers
 Roger Pusey – producer
 Dale "Buffin" Griffin – producer
 Martin Colley - engineer 
 Mike Robinson – engineer ("Accept Yourself")

Chart positions
Album

Sales

|}

References

The Smiths compilation albums
Peel Sessions recordings
B-side compilation albums
1984 live albums
1984 compilation albums
Rough Trade Records compilation albums
Rough Trade Records live albums
Sire Records compilation albums
Albums produced by Dale Griffin
Albums produced by Roger Pusey
Sire Records live albums
The Smiths live albums